Liudolf of Lotharingia, also Ludolf (c. 100010 April 1031), was Count of Zutphen and Waldenburg.

He was born in Saxony about 1000, the eldest son of Ezzo, Count Palatine of Lotharingia, and his wife Matilde of Germany, daughter of the Emperor Otto II and Theophanu. Besides being Count of Zutphen and Waldenburg, Liudolf was military commander of the army of the Archbishop of Cologne, and protector (Vogt) of the abbeys of Brauweiler, Münster and Borghorst.

He died on 10 April 1031, and was buried with his parents in Brauweiler Abbey.

Liudolf married Matilda of Zutphen, by whom he had issue:

Heinrich, d. 1031;
Conrad I (also called Kuno or Cuno), Count of Zutphen and Duke of Bavaria (died in 1055, buried in Cologne); 
Adelheid (born in Zutphen, Gelderland, about 1030), heiress of her brothers to Zutphen, Waldenburg, etc. She married Godeschalk, Count of Zutphen in right of his wife (b. ca. 1030, died 1063/4), mother of Otto II, Count of Zutphen.

Ezzonids
Counts of Zutphen
1000s births
1031 deaths
People of Byzantine descent
Burials at Brauweiler Abbey